Government architect may refer to:

Australia
New South Wales Government Architect
Northern Territory Government Architect
Queensland Government Architect
 South Australia Government Architect
Victorian Government Architect
Western Australia Government Architect

Elsewhere
Chief Government Architect of the Netherlands

See also
Chief architect (disambiguation)
 Colonial Architect (disambiguation)
State architect